The 1993 Supercopa Libertadores Finals was a two-legged football series to determine the winner of the 1993 Supercopa Libertadores. The finals were contested by two Brazilian clubs, São Paulo and Flamengo.

In the first leg, held in Maracanã Stadium in Rio de Janeiro, both teams tied 2–2. The second leg was held in Estádio do Morumbi in São Paulo, being also a 2–2 draw. As both teams equaled on points and goal difference, a penalty shoot-out was carried out to decide a winner. Sao Paulo won 5–4 on penalties, becoming Supercopa Libertadores champion for the first time.

Qualified teams

Venues

Match details

First leg

Second leg

References

1
s
s
Supercopa Libertadores Finals